The Kingston Fortifications are a series of 19th century defensive works in Kingston, Ontario, Canada, that are National Historic Sites of Canada and UNESCO World Heritage Sites (as part of the Rideau Canal inscription). The fortification system consisting of five installations:
 Fort Henry
 Fort Frederick
 Murney Tower
 Shoal Tower
 Cathcart Tower

See also
 List of National Historic Sites of Canada in Kingston, Ontario

References

External links

Buildings and structures in Kingston, Ontario
National Historic Sites in Ontario
World Heritage Sites in Canada